No Limite 2 was the second season of the Brazilian reality show No Limite filmed in Chapada dos Guimarães, Mato Grosso, Brazil. The premiere aired Sunday, 28 January 2001.

Twelve contestants were chosen by the producers to participate the show between January and February 2001.

The two initial tribes were Araras Vermelhas and Lobos Guarás. On episode 5, the two teams merged into a tribe called Araguará, named for a combination of two tribes.

In the season finale, the four remaining players competed in the second-to-last immunity challenge, who was an endurance challenge.

At the Tribal Council, only Léo (the winning player) secured his spot on the Final Two. The tribemates voted Dada out of their tribe.

Later a special jury (made of the last four eliminated players before the final four: Sônia, Sávio, Rosa and Eliane) voted Danilo out, leaving Léo and Christina as the finalists.

The Final Two faced off for the final immunity challenge, which was an extremely grueling, multi-part challenge, and the most elaborate challenge of the entire season, often combining elements from previous challenges.

Weeks later, on 25 March 2001, live from Rio de Janeiro, student Léo Rassi was announced as the winner of the competition. He won R$300,000 and a brand-new car, while runner-up Christina Moreira won R$50,000.

Contestants

The game

Voting history

External links
 Official Site 
 No Limite on Gshow.com

2001 Brazilian television seasons
No Limite seasons